George Denis Patrick Carlin (May 12, 1937 – June 22, 2008) was an American comedian, actor, author, and social critic. Regarded as one of the most important and influential stand-up comedians of all time, he was dubbed "the dean of counterculture comedians". He was known for his black comedy and reflections on politics, the English language, psychology, religion, and taboo subjects. His "seven dirty words" routine was central to the 1978 United States Supreme Court case F.C.C. v. Pacifica Foundation, in which a 5–4 decision affirmed the government's power to censor indecent material on public airwaves.

The first of Carlin's 14 stand-up comedy specials for HBO was filmed in 1977, broadcast as George Carlin at USC. From the late 1980s onwards, his routines focused on sociocultural criticism of American society. He often commented on American political issues and satirized American culture. He was a frequent performer and guest host on The Tonight Show during the three-decade Johnny Carson era and hosted the first episode of Saturday Night Live in 1975. His final comedy special, It's Bad for Ya, was filmed less than four months before his death from cardiac failure. In 2008, he was posthumously awarded the Mark Twain Prize for American Humor. In 2004, he placed second on Comedy Central's list of top 10 American comedians. In 2017, Rolling Stone magazine ranked him second (behind Richard Pryor) on its list of the 50 best stand-up comedians of all time.

Carlin's film roles included a taxi driver in Car Wash, Frank Madras in Outrageous Fortune, Rufus in Bill & Ted's Excellent Adventure and Bill & Ted's Bogus Journey, Eddie Detreville in The Prince of Tides, Cardinal Ignatius Glick in Dogma, Hitchhiker in Jay and Silent Bob Strike Back, Architect in Scary Movie 3, and Bart Trinké in Jersey Girl. He also had voice roles as Zugor in Tarzan II, Fillmore in Cars, and as Mr. Conductor on Shining Time Station, as well as narrating the American dubs for the Thomas & Friends segments.

Early life 
George Denis Patrick Carlin was born at New York Hospital in Manhattan on May 12, 1937, the second of two sons born to Mary (née Bearey, 1896–1984) and Patrick John Carlin (1888–1945). Carlin had an older brother, Patrick Jr. (1931–2022), who later had a major influence on his comedy.  His mother was born in New York City to Irish immigrants and his father was himself an Irish immigrant from Cloghan, a village in County Donegal in Ulster, leading Carlin to later describe himself as "fully Irish". He wrote in his posthumously published autobiography Last Words that, when his first wife Brenda was alive, "I used to have a fantasy of Ireland, the southeastern parts so that it would be a little warmer, and the two of us there, close enough to Dublin that you could go buy things you needed." His parents separated when he was two months old because of his father's alcoholism, so his mother raised him and his brother on her own. His father died when Carlin was eight years old. Carlin's maternal grandfather, Dennis Bearey, was an NYPD police officer, who wrote out the works of William Shakespeare by hand for fun.

Carlin said that he picked up an appreciation for the effective use of the English language from his mother, though they had a difficult relationship and he often ran away from home. He grew up on West 121st Street in the Morningside Heights neighborhood of Manhattan, which he and his friends called "White Harlem" because it "sounded a lot tougher than its real name". He attended Corpus Christi School, a Roman Catholic parish school of the Corpus Christi Church in Morningside Heights. One of Carlin's best childhood friends was fellow student Randy Jurgensen who went on to become one of the most decorated homicide detectives in the NYPD's history. His mother owned a television, which was a new technology few people owned at the time, and Carlin became an avid fan of the pioneering late-night talk show Broadway Open House during its short run. He went to the Bronx for high school but, after three semesters, was expelled from Cardinal Hayes High School at age 15. He briefly attended Bishop Dubois High School in Harlem and Salesian High School in Goshen. He spent many summers at Camp Notre Dame in Spofford, New Hampshire, where he regularly won the camp's drama award. Later, at his request, some of his ashes were spread at Spofford Lake upon his death.

Carlin joined the U.S. Air Force and trained as a radar technician. He was stationed at Barksdale Air Force Base in Bossier City, Louisiana, and began working as a disc jockey at radio station KJOE in nearby Shreveport. Labeled an "unproductive airman" by his superiors, he received a general discharge on July 29, 1957. During his time in the Air Force, he had been court-martialed three times and received many nonjudicial punishments and reprimands.

Career

1960s to 1970s 

In 1959, Carlin met Jack Burns, a fellow DJ at radio station KXOL in Fort Worth, Texas. They formed a comedy team and after successful performances at Fort Worth's beat coffeehouse called The Cellar, Burns and Carlin headed for California in February 1960.

Within weeks of arriving in California, Burns and Carlin put together an audition tape and created The Wright Brothers, a morning show on KDAY in Hollywood. During their tenure at KDAY, they honed their material in beatnik coffeehouses at night. Years later when he was honored with a star on the Hollywood Walk of Fame, Carlin requested that it be placed in front of the KDAY studios near the corner of Sunset Boulevard and Vine Street. Burns and Carlin recorded their only album, Burns and Carlin at the Playboy Club Tonight, in May 1960 at Cosmo Alley in Hollywood. After two years together as a team, they parted to pursue individual careers, but "remain[ed] the best of friends".

In the 1960s, Carlin began appearing on television variety shows, where he played various characters including a Native American sergeant, a stupid radio disc jockey, and a hippie weatherman. Variations on these routines appear on Carlin's 1967 debut album, Take-Offs and Put-Ons, which was recorded live in 1966 at The Roostertail in Detroit, Michigan and issued by RCA Victor in 1967. During this period, Carlin became a frequent performer and guest host on The Tonight Show, initially with Jack Paar as host, and then with Johnny Carson. Carlin became one of Carson's most frequent substitutes during the host's three-decade reign. Carlin was also cast in Away We Go, a 1967 comedy show that aired on CBS. His material during his early career and his appearance, which consisted of suits and short-cropped hair, had been seen as "conventional", particularly when contrasted with his later anti-establishment material.

Carlin was present at Lenny Bruce's arrest for obscenity. As the police began attempting to detain members of the audience for questioning, they asked Carlin for his identification. Telling the police he did not believe in government-issued IDs, he was arrested and taken to jail with Bruce in the same vehicle. In the late 1960s, Carlin was making about $250,000 annually. 
Over time, Carlin changed his routines and his appearance; he grew his hair long, sported a beard and earrings, and typically dressed in T-shirts and blue jeans. He lost some TV bookings by dressing strangely for a comedian at a time when clean-cut, well-dressed comedians were the norm. He hired talent managers Jeff Wald and Ron De Blasio to help him change his image, making him look more "hip" for a younger audience. Wald put Carlin into much smaller clubs such as The Troubadour in West Hollywood and The Bitter End in New York City, and later said that Carlin's income was thus reduced by 90% but his later career arc was greatly improved. In 1970, record producer Monte Kay formed the Little David Records subsidiary of Atlantic Records, with comedian Flip Wilson as co-owner. Kay and Wilson signed Carlin away from RCA Records and recorded a Carlin performance at Washington, D.C.'s Cellar Door in May 1971, which was released as FM & AM in January 1972. De Blasio was busy managing the fast-paced career of Freddie Prinze and was about to sign Richard Pryor, so he released Carlin to Little David general manager Jack Lewis, who, like Carlin, was somewhat wild and rebellious. Using his own persona as a springboard for his new comedy, he was presented by Ed Sullivan in a performance of "The Hair Piece" and quickly regained his popularity as the public caught on to his sense of style.

Starting in 1972, singer-songwriter Kenny Rankin was Carlin's label mate on Little David Records, and Rankin served many times as Carlin's musical guest or opening act during the early 1970s. The two flew together in Carlin's private jet; Carlin says that Rankin relapsed into using cocaine while on tour since Carlin had so much of the drug available. The album FM & AM proved very popular. It marked Carlin's change from mainstream to counterculture comedy. The "AM" side was an extension of Carlin's previous style, with zany but relatively clean routines parodying aspects of American life. The "FM" side introduced Carlin's new style, with references to marijuana and birth control pills, and a playful examination of the word "shit". In this manner, Carlin renewed a style of radical social commentary comedy that Lenny Bruce had pioneered in the late 1950s.

In this period, Carlin perfected his well-known "seven dirty words" routine, which most notably appears on Class Clown as follows: "'Shit', 'piss', 'fuck', 'cunt', 'cocksucker', 'motherfucker', and 'tits'. Those are the heavy seven. Those are the ones that'll infect your soul, curve your spine and keep the country from winning the war." On July 21, 1972, Carlin was arrested after performing this routine at Milwaukee's Summerfest and charged with violating obscenity laws. The case, which prompted Carlin to refer to the words for a time as the "Milwaukee Seven", was dismissed in December when the judge declared that the language was indecent but that Carlin had the freedom to say it as long as he caused no disturbance. In 1973, a man complained to the FCC after listening with his son to a similar routine, "Filthy Words" from Carlin's Occupation: Foole, which was broadcast one afternoon over radio station WBAI. Pacifica received a citation from the FCC for violating regulations that prohibit broadcasting "obscene" material. The Supreme Court upheld the FCC action by a vote of 5 to 4, ruling that the routine was "indecent but not obscene" and that the FCC had authority to prohibit such broadcasts during hours when children were likely to be among the audience.

The controversy increased Carlin's fame. He eventually expanded the "dirty words" theme with a seemingly interminable end to a performance, finishing with his voice fading out in one HBO version and accompanying the credits in the Carlin at Carnegie special for the 1982–83 season, and a set of 49 web pages organized by subject and embracing his "Incomplete List of Impolite Words". On stage, during a rendition of this routine, Carlin learned that his previous comedy album FM & AM had won a Grammy. Midway through the performance on the album Occupation: Foole, he can be heard thanking someone for handing him a piece of paper. He then exclaimed "shit!" and proudly announced his win to the audience.

George Carlin was arrested seven times for reciting the "Seven Dirty Words" routine.

Carlin hosted the premiere broadcast of NBC's Saturday Night Live on October 11, 1975. Per his request, he did not appear in its sketches. The following season, 1976–1977, he appeared regularly on CBS Television's Tony Orlando & Dawn variety series.

Carlin unexpectedly stopped performing regularly in 1976, when his career appeared to be at its height. For the next five years, he rarely performed stand-up, although it was at this time that he began doing specials for HBO as part of its On Location series; he did 14 specials, including 2008's It's Bad For Ya! He later revealed that he had suffered the first of three heart attacks during this layoff period. His first two HBO specials aired in 1977 and 1978.

1980s 
In 1981, Carlin returned to the stage, releasing A Place for My Stuff and returning to HBO and New York City with the Carlin at Carnegie TV special, videotaped at Carnegie Hall and airing during the 1982–83 season. Carlin continued doing HBO specials every year or two over the following decade and a half. All of Carlin's albums from this time forward are from the HBO specials.

He hosted SNL for the second time on November 10, 1984, this time appearing in several sketches.

Carlin began to achieve prominence as a film actor with a major supporting role in the 1987 comedy hit Outrageous Fortune, starring Bette Midler and Shelley Long; it was his first notable screen role after a handful of previous guest roles on television series. Playing drifter Frank Madras, he poked fun at the lingering effect of the 1960s counterculture. In 1989, he gained popularity with a new generation of teens when he was cast as Rufus, the time-traveling mentor of the title characters in Bill & Ted's Excellent Adventure, and reprised his role in the film sequel Bill & Ted's Bogus Journey as well as the first season of the cartoon series.

1990s 

In 1991, Carlin had a major supporting role in the movie The Prince of Tides, which starred Nick Nolte and Barbra Streisand, portraying the gay neighbor of the main character's suicidal sister.

He also played the role of "Mr Conductor" on the PBS show Shining Time Station and narrated the show's sequences of the American and New Zealand version of the children's television series Thomas & Friends from 1991 to 1996, replacing Ringo Starr. Carlin narrated the first four seasons of what would later become known as Thomas & Friends for use on Shining Time Station. According to Britt Allcroft, who developed both shows, on the first day of the assignment, Carlin was nervous about recording his narration without an audience, so the producers put a stuffed teddy bear in the booth.

In 1993, Carlin began a weekly Fox sitcom, The George Carlin Show, playing New York City taxicab driver George O'Grady.  The show, created and written by The Simpsons co-creator Sam Simon, ran 27 episodes through December 1995. In his final book, the posthumously published Last Words, Carlin said about The George Carlin Show, "I had a great time. I never laughed so much, so often, so hard as I did with cast members Alex Rocco, Chris Rich, Tony Starke. There was a very strange, very good sense of humor on that stage ... [but] I was incredibly happy when the show was canceled. I was frustrated that it had taken me away from my true work."

Carlin was honored at the 1997 Aspen Comedy Festival with a retrospective, George Carlin: 40 Years of Comedy, hosted by Jon Stewart. His first hardcover book, Brain Droppings (1997), sold nearly 900,000 copies and spent 40 weeks on the New York Times best-seller list.

2000s 
Carlin later explained that there were other, more pragmatic reasons for abandoning his acting career in favor of standup. In an interview for Esquire magazine in 2001, he said, "Because of my abuse of drugs, I neglected my business affairs and had large arrears with the IRS, and that took me eighteen to twenty years to dig out of. I did it honorably, and I don't begrudge them. I don't hate paying taxes, and I'm not angry at anyone, because I was complicit in it. But I'll tell you what it did for me: it made me a way better comedian. Because I had to stay out on the road and I couldn't pursue that movie career, which would have gone nowhere, and I became a really good comic and a really good writer."

In 2001, Carlin was given a Lifetime Achievement Award at the 15th Annual American Comedy Awards. In December 2003, Representative Doug Ose (R-California) introduced a bill (H.R. 3687) to outlaw the broadcast of Carlin's "seven dirty words", including "compound use (including hyphenated compounds) of such words and phrases with each other or with other words or phrases, and other grammatical forms of such words and phrases (including verb, adjective, gerund, participle, and infinitive forms)". The bill omitted "tits", but included "asshole", which was not one of Carlin's original seven words. The bill was referred to the House Judiciary Subcommittee on the Constitution in January 2004, where it was tabled.

Carlin performed regularly as a headliner in Las Vegas, but in 2004 his run at the MGM Grand Las Vegas was terminated after an altercation with his audience. After a poorly received set, filled with dark references to suicide bombings and beheadings, Carlin complained that he could not wait to get out of "this fucking hotel" and Las Vegas; he wanted to go back east, he said, "where the real people are". He continued: "People who go to Las Vegas, you've got to question their fucking intellect to start with. Traveling hundreds and thousands of miles to essentially give your money to a large corporation is kind of fucking moronic. That's what I'm always getting here is these kind of fucking people with very limited intellects." When an audience member shouted, "Stop degrading us!" Carlin responded, "Thank you very much, whatever that was. I hope it was positive; if not, well, blow me." He was immediately fired, and soon thereafter his representative announced that he would begin treatment for alcohol and prescription painkiller addiction on his own initiative.

Following his thirteenth HBO special on November 5, 2005, Life Is Worth Losing, which aired live from the Beacon Theatre in New York City – during which he mentioned, "I've got 341 days sober" – Carlin toured his new material through the first half of 2006. Topics included suicide, natural disasters, cannibalism, genocide, human sacrifice, threats to civil liberties in the U.S., and the case for his theory that humans are inferior to other animals. At the first tour stop in February at the Tachi Palace Casino in Lemoore, California, Carlin mentioned that the appearance was his "first show back" after a six-week hospitalization for heart failure and pneumonia.

In the 2006 Disney/Pixar animated feature Cars, Carlin voiced Fillmore, is an anti-establishment hippie VW Microbus with a psychedelic paint job and the license plate "51237" – Carlin's birthday. In 2007, Carlin voiced the wizard in Happily N'Ever After, his last film. Carlin's last HBO stand-up special, It's Bad for Ya, aired live on March 1, 2008, from the Wells Fargo Center for the Arts in Santa Rosa, California. Themes included "American bullshit", rights, death, old age, and child rearing. He repeated the theme to his audience several times throughout the show: "It's all bullshit, and it's bad for ya." When asked on Inside the Actors Studio what turned him on, he responded, "Reading about language." When asked what made him proudest of his career, he said the number of his books that have been sold, close to a million copies.

Personal life 
In August 1960, while touring with comedy partner Jack Burns in Dayton, Ohio, Carlin met Brenda Hosbrook. They were married at her parents' home in Dayton on June 3, 1961. The couple's only child, Kelly Marie Carlin, was born on June 15, 1963. The two renewed their wedding vows in Las Vegas in 1971. Hosbrook died of liver cancer on May 11, 1997, the day before Carlin's 60th birthday. Six months later, he met comedy writer Sally Wade, and later described it as "love at first sight" but admitted that he was hesitant to act on his feelings so soon after his wife's death. He eventually married Wade in a private and unregistered ceremony on June 24, 1998. The marriage lasted until Carlin's death in 2008, two days before their 10-year anniversary.

In a 2008 interview, Carlin stated that using cannabis, LSD, and mescaline had helped him cope with events in his personal life. He also stated several times that he had battled addictions to alcohol, Vicodin, and cocaine, and spent some time in a rehab facility in late 2004. Although born into a Catholic family, he vocally rejected religion in all of its forms, and frequently criticized and mocked it in his comedy routines. When asked if he believed in God, he responded, "No. No, there's no God, but there might be some sort of an organizing intelligence, and I think to understand it is way beyond our ability."

Health problems and death
Carlin had a history of heart problems spanning three decades. This included heart attacks in 1978, 1982, and 1991; an arrhythmia requiring an ablation procedure in 2003; a significant episode of heart failure in 2005; and two angioplasties on undisclosed dates. On June 22, 2008, at the age of 71, he died of heart failure at Saint John's Health Center in Santa Monica, California. His death occurred one week after his last performance at The Orleans Hotel and Casino. In accordance with his wishes, his body was cremated and his ashes were scattered in front of various New York City nightclubs and over Spofford Lake in New Hampshire, where he had attended summer camp as an adolescent.

Tributes

Upon his death, HBO broadcast 11 of his 14 HBO specials from June 25 to 28, including a 12-hour marathon block on their HBO Comedy channel. NBC scheduled a rerun of the premiere episode of Saturday Night Live, which Carlin hosted. Both Sirius Satellite Radio's "Raw Dog Comedy" and XM Satellite Radio's "XM Comedy" channels ran a memorial marathon of George Carlin recordings the day following his death. Sirius XM Satellite Radio has since devoted an entire channel to Carlin, entitled Carlin's Corner, featuring all of his comedy albums, live concerts, and works from his private archives. Larry King devoted his entire show of June 23 to a tribute to Carlin, featuring interviews with Jerry Seinfeld, Bill Maher, Roseanne Barr and Lewis Black, as well as Carlin's daughter Kelly and his brother, Patrick Jr. On June 24, The New York Times printed an op-ed piece on Carlin by Jerry Seinfeld. Cartoonist Garry Trudeau paid tribute in his Doonesbury comic strip on July 27.

Four days before Carlin's death, the John F. Kennedy Center for the Performing Arts had named him its 2008 Mark Twain Prize for American Humor honoree. He became its first posthumous recipient on November 10, 2008, in Washington, D.C. Comedians honoring him at the ceremony included Jon Stewart, Bill Maher, Lily Tomlin (a past Twain Humor Prize winner), Lewis Black, Denis Leary, Joan Rivers, and Margaret Cho. Louis C.K. dedicated his stand-up special Chewed Up to Carlin, and Lewis Black dedicated the second season of Root of All Evil to him.

For a number of years, Carlin had been compiling and writing his autobiography, to be released in conjunction with a one-man Broadway show tentatively titled New York Boy. After Carlin's death, Tony Hendra, his collaborator on both projects, edited the autobiography for release as Last Words. The book, chronicling most of Carlin's life and future plans, including the one-man show, was published in 2009. The abridged audio edition is narrated by Carlin's brother, Patrick Jr.

The George Carlin Letters: The Permanent Courtship of Sally Wade, by Carlin's widow, a collection of previously unpublished writings and artwork by Carlin interwoven with Wade's chronicle of their 10 years together, was published in March 2011. The subtitle is a phrase on a handwritten note that Wade found next to her computer upon returning home from the hospital after her husband's death. In 2008 Carlin's daughter Kelly announced plans to publish an "oral history", a collection of stories from Carlin's friends and family. She later indicated that the project had been shelved in favor of completion of her own project, an autobiographical one-woman show, A Carlin Home Companion: Growing Up with George.

On October 22, 2014, a portion of West 121st Street, in the Morningside Heights neighborhood of Manhattan where Carlin spent his childhood, was renamed "George Carlin Way".

Moneyball screenwriter Stan Chervin announced in October 2018 that a biopic of Carlin was in process.

On August 10, 2020, it was announced that Judd Apatow and Michael Bonfiglio would direct a documentary about Carlin. The documentary, titled George Carlin's American Dream, was released on May 20, 2022 on HBO Max.

In a Netflix stand-up special released in May 2022, The Hall: Honoring the Greats of Stand-Up inducted George Carlin into the National Comedy Center in 
Jamestown, NY.

Influences and legacy
Carlin's influences included Danny Kaye, Jonathan Winters, Lenny Bruce, Richard Pryor, Nichols and May, Jerry Lewis, the Marx Brothers, Mort Sahl, Spike Jones, Ernie Kovacs, and the Ritz Brothers.

Comedians who have claimed Carlin as an influence include Adam Ferrara, Bill Burr, Chris Rock, Jerry Seinfeld, Louis C.K., Lewis Black, Jon Stewart, Stephen Colbert, Bill Maher, Liz Miele, Patrice O'Neal, Colin Quinn, Steven Wright, Mitch Hedberg, Russell Peters, Bo Burnham, Jay Leno, Ben Stiller, Kevin Smith, Chris Rush, Rob McElhenney, and Jim Jefferies.

The "Carlin Warning" 
After Carlin's seven dirty words routine and subsequent FCC v. Pacifica Foundation Supreme Court ruling in 1978, broadcasters started to use the "Carlin Warning" to remind performers of the words they could not say during a live performance.

Internet hoaxes 
Many online quotes have been falsely attributed to Carlin, including various joke lists, rants, and other pieces. The web site Snopes, which debunks urban legends and myths, has addressed these hoaxes. Many of them contain material that runs counter to Carlin's viewpoints; some are especially volatile toward racial groups, gay people, women, the homeless, and other targets. Carlin was aware of these bogus e-mails and debunked them on his own website: "Here's a rule of thumb, folks: nothing you see on the Internet is mine unless it comes from one of my albums, books, HBO specials, or appeared on my website. [...] It bothers me that some people might believe that I would be capable of writing some of this stuff." Weird Al Yankovic referenced the hoaxes in his song "Stop Forwarding That Crap to Me" with the line, "And by the way, your quotes from George Carlin aren't really George Carlin."

Works

Discography 
 Main
 1963: Burns and Carlin at the Playboy Club Tonight
 1967: Take-Offs and Put-Ons
 1972: FM & AM
 1972: Class Clown
 1973: Occupation: Foole
 1974: Toledo Window Box
 1975: An Evening with Wally Londo Featuring Bill Slaszo
 1977: On the Road
 1981: A Place for My Stuff
 1984: Carlin on Campus
 1986: Playin' with Your Head
 1988: What Am I Doing in New Jersey?
 1990: Parental Advisory: Explicit Lyrics
 1992: Jammin' in New York
 1996: Back in Town
 1999: You Are All Diseased
 2001: Complaints and Grievances
 2006: Life Is Worth Losing
 2008: It's Bad for Ya
 2016: I Kinda Like It When a Lotta People Die
 Compilations
 1978: Indecent Exposure: Some of the Best of George Carlin
 1984: The George Carlin Collection
 1992: Classic Gold
 1999: The Little David Years

Film

Television

Video games

HBO specials

Written works

Audiobooks 
 Brain Droppings
 Napalm and Silly Putty
 More Napalm & Silly Putty
 George Carlin Reads to You (Compilation of Brain Droppings, Napalm and Silly Putty, and More Napalm & Silly Putty)
 When Will Jesus Bring the Pork Chops?

See also 
 Counterculture of the 1960s

References

External links

 
 
 
 
 
 
 
 

 
1937 births
2008 deaths
20th-century American comedians
20th-century American male actors
21st-century American comedians
21st-century American male actors
American stand-up comedians
American atheists
American columnists
American comedy writers
American humorists
American male comedians
American male comedy actors
American male film actors
American male television actors
American male voice actors
American media critics
American people of Irish descent
American political commentators
American political writers
American satirists
American skeptics
American sketch comedians
American social commentators
American television hosts
Atlantic Records artists
Audiobook narrators
Censorship in the arts
Comedians from California
Comedians from New York City
Critics of religions
Former Roman Catholics
Grammy Award winners
Humor researchers
Irish-American culture in New York City
Irony theorists
Las Vegas shows
Male actors from California
Male actors from New York City
American male screenwriters
American male television writers
Mark Twain Prize recipients
Obscenity controversies in stand-up comedy
People from Harlem
People from Morningside Heights, Manhattan
Screenwriters from California
Screenwriters from New York (state)
United States Air Force airmen
Writers from Manhattan
Religious comedy and humour
Cardinal Hayes High School alumni
20th-century American screenwriters